SamLogic was founded 1992 in Stockholm, Sweden (where it also is headquartered), and the company has since then developed software for the Windows operating system. From the beginning the company only created development tools for developers, but today they create software that also suits to non-programmers. Since a few years back SamLogic is specialized in software for the Internet and Multimedia. Examples of software that SamLogic has developed are: CD-Menu Creator (menu designer tool), Visual Installer (setup tool) and MultiMailer (e-mail marketing tool). SamLogic has also developed a copy protection called RegGuard.

References

External links 
 

Software companies of Sweden
Companies based in Stockholm